Bharat Nagar railway station is a railway station in Hyderabad, Telangana, India. Localities like Kukatpally and Nizampet are accessible from this station.

Lines
Multi-Modal Transport System, Hyderabad
Secunderabad–Falaknuma route (FS Line)

MMTS stations in Ranga Reddy district

Other than MMTS trains no trains will stop here.
No wheel chair facility
Direct auto from this station to moti nagar , borabanda